The Living Stone is a 1958 Canadian short documentary film directed by John Feeney and produced by the National Film Board of Canada.
It shows the inspiration behind Inuit sculpture, where the aim of the artist is to release the image he or she sees imprisoned in the stone. Among its numerous honours was a nomination, at the 31st Academy Awards, for Best Documentary Short Film. 

The 32-minute film is included in the 2011 Inuit film anthology Unikkausivut: Sharing Our Stories, bringing together over 100 films by and about Canadian Inuit, distributed on DVD to Inuit communities across the Canadian North and available online.

Awards
 11th Canadian Film Awards, Toronto: Award of Merit, General Information, 1959
 Locarno Film Festival, Locarno, Switzerland: Diploma of Honour, 1959
 International Filmfestival Mannheim-Heidelberg, Mannheim: Special Commendation, 1959
 Robert J. Flaherty Film Awards, City College Institute of Film Techniques: Honourable Mention, 1959
 Winnipeg Film Council Annual Film Festival, Winnipeg: Best Canadian Film, Short Subject, 1959
 Festival of Tourist and Folklore Films, Brussels: CIDALC Medal of Honour, 1960
 American Film and Video Festival, New York: Blue Ribbon, Graphic Arts, Sculpture and Architecture, 1960
 Rapallo International Film Festival, Rapallo, Italy: Special Prize, Cup of the Minister of Tourism and Entertainment for Best Foreign Film, 1960
 Rapallo International Film Festival, Rapallo, Italy: Second Prize, Silver Cup of the Province of Genoa, 1960
 SODRE International Festival of Documentary and Experimental Films, Montevideo, Uruguay: Honourable Mention 1960
 International Festival of Films on People and Countries, La Spezia, Italy: Silver Cup for the Most Popular Film of the Festival, 1967
 International Festival of Films on People and Countries, La Spezia, Italy: Medal for Best Ethnological Film, 1967
 International Maritime and Exploration Film Festival, Toulon, France: Ergo Prize of the Presidency of the Republic, 1969
 31st Academy Awards, Los Angeles: Nominee: Best Documentary Short Film, 1958

References

External links

Watch The Living Stone at NFB.ca

1958 films
1958 documentary films
1958 short films
Canadian short documentary films
English-language Canadian films
National Film Board of Canada documentaries
Films directed by John Feeney
Documentary films about visual artists
Inuit art
Films produced by Tom Daly
National Film Board of Canada short films
Documentary films about Inuit in Canada
1950s Canadian films
1950s short documentary films